Milwaukee Chiefs may refer to:

Milwaukee Chiefs (AFL), team that competed in the third American Football League
Milwaukee Chiefs (ice hockey), team that competed in the International Hockey League